Estonia–Poland relations is the official relationship between Estonia and Poland. Both nations enjoy close and friendly relations, and are close allies. Both nations are members of NATO, the European Union, OECD, OSCE, Bucharest Nine, Three Seas Initiative, United Nations, Council of Europe, Council of the Baltic Sea States, HELCOM and World Trade Organization.
The two countries became members of the European Union in 2004.

History

Estonia, then known as Livonia, was incorporated into the territory of Grand Duchy of Lithuania and later, the Polish–Lithuanian Commonwealth, which become Duchy of Livonia under Polish rule. The Livonian War further secured Polish authority, having halted Russian attempt to conquer the region.  Livonia didn't hold any significant position in the Commonwealth's history since it was divided between the Poles, Swedes and Danes; as for its remoteness outside tax incomes, and this would remain until both fell into the hand of the Russian Empire.

Under the Russian rule however, Livonia, and later Estonia, was seen to be the least oppressed under the rule of tsarist Russia and received a nominal level of autonomy, notably the rise of Orthodox Christianity; however, Congress Poland and later Russian Poland did not receive similar sympathy, and was under complete oppression led by the Russian Imperial government. Nonetheless, in 1905, unrests in Russia became widespread and it hit to Estonia and Poland. For the Estonians, their major opponent was not the Russians but the Germans at the time, but since the Germans were given privileges in Russia, anti-German unrest in Estonia aimed directly against tsarist authoritarian rule. For the Poles, the Russians and Germans were both common oppressors, also rose up against both.

After the end of World War I, both Estonia and Poland regained independence. However, increasing invasions from the Bolsheviks put two nations into one common front against the Soviet Russians. Estonia was not able to repel the Soviets, but Polish success in the Polish–Soviet War helped both to keep their independence. From 1920s, Poland and Estonia were allies, though there was little contact between them. In 1922, Poland and Estonia were among signatories of the Warsaw Accord, which however did not enter into force, as its other signatory Finland did not ratify it under pressure of Germany, which was hostile to Poland. Instead, in 1925, Poland and Estonia together with Finland and Latvia signed a convention on conciliation and arbitration in Helsinki.

In 1937–1938, both ethnic Poles and Estonians in the Soviet Union were subjected to genocidal campaigns carried out by the NKVD, known as the Polish Operation and the Estonian Operation respectively. Following the Molotov–Ribbentrop Pact, Poland and Estonia were both invaded and occupied during World War II. Poland was occupied by Nazi Germany and the Soviet Union since September 1939, while Estonia was occupied solely by the Soviet Union since June 1940. Both nations were under common oppression, and many Poles and Estonians were forcefully deported by the Russians to Siberia. In the course of Operation Barbarossa, from mid-1941, both countries were entirely occupied by Germany.

In 1944–1945, both countries were again occupied by Soviet forces. Soviet repressions and deportations of both Estonian and Polish citizens continued. Poland's formal independence was eventually restored, although with a Soviet-installed communist regime, while Estonia was annexed into the Soviet Union, thus both had no relationship until the dissolution of the Soviet Union.

Today

With both Estonia and Poland freed from Soviet oppression, two countries reestablished tie in 1991.

Since 1991, trades and cooperation between Estonia and Poland had increased dramatically, turning them into economic and political partnership. Estonia considers Poland as its priority on their relations.

Both Estonia and Poland are member of NATO and the European Union. Their relations have enjoyed a significant boost since 2000s. The threat from Russia, which increased under Vladimir Putin, has also prompted two countries to set closer tie together against a common foe.

April 12, 2010, was declared a day of national mourning in Estonia to commemorate the 96 victims of the Smolensk air disaster, including Polish President Lech Kaczyński and his wife Maria Kaczyńska.

There is a small dispute between Estonia and Poland over desynchronisation, which Poland was reluctant to establish the AC link to Estonia.

The Polish Air Force takes part in the NATO Baltic Air Policing mission to guard the airspace over the Baltic states including Estonia. In 2021, Prime Minister of Estonia Kaja Kallas named Poland a key ally of Estonia.

Poland and Estonia co-hosted the 2021 Men's European Volleyball Championship.

In November 2021, during the Belarus–European Union border crisis, Estonia decided to send 100 troops from the Estonian Defence Forces to help Poland.

In 2022, Estonian and Polish gas grids were connected, following the commissioning of the GIPL interconnection, also providing Estonia with a connection to the EU gas market. The Rail Baltica and Via Baltica, modern rail and road links of vital importance, connecting Estonia with Poland and Central Europe, remain under construction (as of 2022).

Resident diplomatic missions
 Estonia has an embassy in Warsaw.
 Poland has an embassy in Tallinn.

See also 
 Foreign relations of Estonia 
 Foreign relations of Poland
 Latvia–Poland relations 
 Lithuania–Poland relations
 Poland in the European Union

References

External links
Embassy of the Republic of Poland in Talinn
Embassy of Estonia, Warsaw

 
Poland
Bilateral relations of Poland
Relations of colonizer and former colony